The Royal Agricultural Winter Fair (RAWF), also known as The Royal, is an annual agricultural fair that is held in Toronto, Ontario, Canada during the first two weeks of November. It was inaugurated in 1922 in the Coliseum, on the grounds of Exhibition Place. It has since been expanded to also take up the Enercare Centre and remains an important exhibit for livestock breeders. Elizabeth II, as Queen of Canada, was the fair's royal patron. Members of the Canadian Royal Family have also been guests of honour at the fair. It is the largest indoor agricultural fair in the world.

History
Following the First World War, a group of farmers led by W. A. Dryden, from Brooklin, Ontario, sought to create a national agricultural exhibition, partly to set national standards for the judging of domestic animals. Together, they formed the Agricultural Winter Fair Association of Canada and quickly received, in 1920, permission from King George V for use of the prefix royal.

In 1920, the City of Toronto approved the construction of a new livestock arena on the Toronto Exhibition Grounds to house the new fair and other uses. Plans called for the first mounting of the Royal Agricultural Winter Fair to take place in 1921, but this was delayed when a heating system for the new arena could not be installed in time. The first show thus opened on 22 November 1922, drawing to its livestock competitions 17,000 entries from several provinces and the United States. The fair then, save for the years when Canada was embroiled in the Second World War, consistently provided for farmers a forum to display equipment, discuss new trends, and showcase wares.
In 1965, significant changes were introduced by the federal Department of Agriculture, which had been a longtime sponsor of The Royal. Both the number of livestock classes for each breed and the number of entries per breeder were reduced; new judging standards were set, emphasizing the utility of the breed; buildings were renovated, and the Winter Garden Show and Horse Show were given more prominence, the latter attracting some 75,000 viewers.

For the fair's 75th anniversary in 1997 a commemorative stamp was issued by Canada Post.

Due to the COVID-19 pandemic the 2020 and 2021 editions of the Royal Agricultural Winter Fair in Toronto were cancelled, as was the case for that summer's Canadian National Exhibition and the Canadian International Air Show, also held at Exhibition Place.

Programme

Today, the Royal Agricultural Winter Fair as a whole sees over 320,000 visits including exhibitors, international and local guests. Over 6,000 animals arrive in Toronto each November, including over 4,900  head of cattle, sheep, goats, pigs, rabbits, and fancy bird, and over 900 horses and ponies, plus a display of crops and vegetables, educational exhibits, and feature attractions. The latter include the Burnbrae Food & Lifestyle Stage, which hosts local and international chef challenges, food sampling, and a wide variety of entertaining and decorating demonstrations during the day. Evening events include craft beer and cider competitions and Royal Champions Day, where guests can sample wine, cheese, and jams; the President's Choice Animal Theatre showcasing animals at work and play, including sheepherding, goats on the go, Spirit of the Horse, rabbit jumping, and President's Choice Superdogs; and the Royal Winter Gallery, which hosts top artists who demonstrate their different styles and techniques along with the opportunity for guests to learn to draw animals. The Royal Horse Show is a gala event that has been a cornerstone of the fair since its inception.

Throughout the fair, guests are encouraged to feed and touch over 60 animals in the Pizza Pizza Petting Farm, discover the journey food takes from farm to home in the aMAZEing Food Journey, ask questions at one of 13 education centres—including beekeeping, alpaca and llama farms, dairy cow milking—and visit the barns to see animals and meet exhibitors.

See also
 List of festivals in Canada
 List of festivals in Ontario
 List of festivals in Toronto

References

External links

 

Agricultural fairs in Canada
Recurring events established in 1922
Organizations based in Canada with royal patronage
Fairs in Ontario
Exhibition Place
Equestrian sports competitions in Canada
Festivals established in 1922
Fall events in Canada